Choqa Sabz-e Naqd-e Ali (also Romanized as Choqā Sabz-e Naqd-e ‘Alī; also known as Chokhā Sabz) is a village in Zirtang Rural District, Kunani District, Kuhdasht County, Lorestan Province, Iran. At the 2006 census, its population was 278, in 45 families.

References 

Towns and villages in Kuhdasht County